Space Launch Complex 10, or Missile Launch Complex 10, is located on Vandenberg Space Force Base in Lompoc, California. It was built in 1958 to test ballistic missiles and developed into a space launching facility in 1963. Prior to 1966 Space Launch Complex 10 West was known as Vandenberg AFB Pad 75-2-6. It remains a rare pristine look at the electronics and facilities created in that era that helped the United States grow its space capabilities.

The last launch from this complex was a Thor booster in 1980. It was declared a National Historic Landmark in 1986.

It is undergoing an eight-year restoration, and public visits are possible, if arranged in advance.

History
The launch complex was built in 1958 by the Douglas Aircraft Corporation, and was first designated Complex 75-2.  At that time it consisted of three launch pads, which were used to train military operators of PGM-17 Thor ballistic missiles, and to conduct missile launch tests.  The first launches were conducted by the British Royal Air Force in June and August 1959.  The facilities at SLC-10 were dismantled and transported to Johnston Island in support of Operation Dominic, a nuclear weapons testing project conducted there in 1962.

The launch complex was rebuilt in 1963 to support the development of Burner rockets, with two launch pads, designated SLC-10E and SLC-10W. Tests were conducted at SLC-10W from 1965 to 1980, using the Thor satellite launch vehicles, the first stages of which followed the design of the Thor missile.

Surviving elements
Two launch pads and a prefabricated launch blockhouse are the principal surviving elements of the complex.  The blockhouse interior still includes all of the electrical equipment used in later launches.  SLC-10W also includes pipes and storage facilities for storing and managing the liquid fuel used in the rockets.

References

Further reading
 
 
 United States Air Force. (1998) Space Launch Complex 10: A National Historic Landmark. Brochure.

External links
Aviation: From Sand Dunes to Sonic Booms, a National Park Service Discover Our Shared Heritage Travel Itinerary
DOD NHL details for California
Historic American Engineering Record (HAER) documentation, filed under North End of Aero Road, Lompoc, Santa Barbara County, CA:

Launch complexes of the United States Space Force
Vandenberg Space Force Base
Buildings and structures in Santa Barbara County, California
Historic American Engineering Record in California
National Historic Landmarks in California
National Register of Historic Places in Santa Barbara County, California
Science and technology in California
1958 establishments in California